The Jalua Volcano is a volcano located in the Northern Red Sea region of Eritrea. It is a stratovolcano, with no eruption ever recorded.

See also
List of volcanoes in Eritrea
List of stratovolcanoes

References

Mountains of Eritrea
Stratovolcanoes of Eritrea
Rift volcanoes